Free Again may refer to:

Free Again (Gene Ammons album) 1972, named after the Barbra Streisand song
Free Again (Lou Bega album) 2010
Free Again, album by Alex Chilton
Free Again, album by Supreme Music Program 2007
Free Again (Robert Pete Williams album), 1961
Free Again, album from Nancy Wilson discography 1972
"Free Again", 1966 hit song, from Barbra Streisand's Greatest Hits
"Free Again", song by TNT from Transistor (TNT album)